Verband Bayerischer Amateurtheater is a theatre company based in Rosenheim, Bavaria, Germany.

Theatre companies in Germany